The Big Bottom Slough Bridge is a historic bridge in rural eastern Independence County, Arkansas. The bridge was built in 1909, and is the only bridge of its type in the area.

The bridge was listed on the National Register of Historic Places in 2004, as "Big Botton Slough Bridge".

See also
List of bridges documented by the Historic American Engineering Record in Arkansas
List of bridges on the National Register of Historic Places in Arkansas
National Register of Historic Places listings in Independence County, Arkansas

References

External links

Historic American Engineering Record in Arkansas
Road bridges on the National Register of Historic Places in Arkansas
Bridges completed in 1909
National Register of Historic Places in Independence County, Arkansas
Pratt truss bridges in the United States
Metal bridges in the United States
1909 establishments in Arkansas
Transportation in Independence County, Arkansas